State Trunk Highway 136 (often called Highway 136, STH-136 or WIS 136) is a state highway in the U.S. state of Wisconsin. It runs east–west in southwest Wisconsin from near Reedsburg to Baraboo. The route was first designated in 1917 but not as WIS 136 until 1935. The route was extended in 2017.

Route description
The highway begins at an intersection with WIS 23/WIS 33 east of Reedsburg. From there, it runs south along Copper Creek. Where Copper Creek drains into the Baraboo River, the highway follows the river in a southeasterly direction to Rock Springs, where it intersects WIS 154 and County Trunk Highway DD (CTH-DD). The highway then runs north of the Baraboo River in an easterly direction from Rock Springs. It intersects CTH-I and continues east and then starts running along Linn Street into West Baraboo. It intersects US 12, where it starts running concurrently with WIS 33 until the concurrency ends at Pine Street, on which it runs south. The highway continues along the Pine Street alignment until it curves to the west, at which point the highway runs east from it. The highway then reaches CTH-DL, and runs concurrently with it until ending at the entrance of Devil's Lake State Park.

History
A highway running near or along the Baraboo River from Reedsburg to Baraboo was designated when the state highway system was established in 1917 as part of WIS 33. In 1935, WIS 33 was rerouted to the north and the bypassed section was redesignated as WIS 136. A former WIS 136 designation running from the current route near North Freedom to Prairie du Sac was downgraded to a County Trunk Highway.

WIS 159

Wisconsin Highway 159 (WIS 159) was a highway that ran from US 12 south of Baraboo to the entrance of Devil's Lake State Park. The highway was first designated in 1924, as a connection between WIS 12 (later US 12) and WIS 123 near its southern terminus at Devil's Lake State Park. In 2016, WIS 123 was decommissioned and the section between WIS 159 and the Devil's Lake State Park entrance would become part of WIS 159. In 2017, it (along with the part of US 12 between it and WIS 136) was redesignated as part of WIS 136 after US 12 was bypassed near Baraboo.

Major intersections

See also

References

External links

136
Transportation in Sauk County, Wisconsin